Streptomyces violaceus is a bacterium species from the genus of Streptomyces which has been isolated from soil. Streptomyces violaceus produces rhodomycine, violamycin-B5 and violarin B.

See also 
 List of Streptomyces species

References

Further reading

External links
Type strain of Streptomyces violaceus at BacDive -  the Bacterial Diversity Metadatabase

violaceus
Bacteria described in 1970